Sun Xiaoguo (born Chen Guo and also known by his alias Li Linchen; 27 October 1977 – 20 February 2020), was a serial child rapist and gang leader from Kunming, China. Sun was known for the brutality of his crimes as well as his evasion of justice. Sun was sentenced to death in 1998, but his sentence was commuted to twenty years due to corruption within the system. He was released in April 2010, after serving 12 years and 5 months. After being released from prison, Sun participated in organised crime under the name "Li Linchen". During a crackdown on organised crime, Sun was arrested on charges of leading an organised criminal gang. When Sun's name appeared in the list of criminal gangs, his case attracted the attention of the media, as he had been sentenced to death 21 years prior. Sun was executed on 20 February 2020. Sun's brutal methods stunned the investigating staff, and the phrase "[Deng] Xiaoping rules in the day, [Sun] Xiaoguo rules in the night" spread in Kunming.

Early life 
Sun was born in Kunming, Yunnan on 27 October 1977. In December 1992, before Sun reached the age of enlistment, his stepfather Li Qiaozhong took advantage of his position as deputy director of the Police Department of the Yunnan Border Guard Command to change Sun's date of birth to 27 October 1975. Subsequently, Sun served in various law enforcement positions.

Criminal activities

October 1994 – April 1996 
On 16 October 1994, Sun, who was a student of the Public Security Border Defense Forces Kunming Command School, and two other youths wandered by a car. They dragged two women into their car on the South Ring Road, Kunming, and drove to Chenggong district, where they gang-raped them.

On 28 October 1994, Sun Xiaoguo was detained, and on 4 April 1995, his arrest was approved. During this time, Sun's  age was corrected from 19 back to 17. In an attempt to get Sun released, his mother Sun Heyu provided a false certificate of illness. On 20 December 1995, the People's Court of Panlong District sentenced Sun to three years in prison. In April 1996, the second ruling of the Kunming Intermediate People's Court ruled that the defendant's appeal was rejected and the original sentence was upheld.

1997 
On 27 March 1997, Sun was not sent to prison because of medical procedures. According to the Chinese Yearbook of Law, within eight months of his release, Sun and his gang committed at least eight crimes, including rape, intentional injury, forced obscenity and insult to women, and provocation.

Between April and June 1997, Sun raped several underage girls in the Chayuan Lou Hotel. The victims included a 15-year-old girl, a 17-year-old female student and her friend, another 15-year-old female student and a 13-year-old female student.

On 17 June 1997, Sun brought a female student under the age of 14 to the Xingzhao Hotel in Kunming and attempted to rape her. Due to her resistance, Sun did not succeed. He then instructed his subordinates to take the girl downstairs and beat her to the point of being "unrecognisable".

On 13 July 1997, Sun's gang had a dispute with another gang in the Bopei Entertainment City in Kunming. Sun and his associates committed vehicular assault and assaulted rival gang members. After the police investigated the gang dispute, they found that Sun was actually a criminal who was currently supposed to be in prison. The police called Sun's mother, who claimed that Sun had returned to his grandmother's house in Sichuan and was not involved in the dispute.

On 22 October 1997, Sun assaulted a restaurant patron who did not obey his commands.

On 7 November 1997, Sun kidnapped two 17-year-old girls and took them to Kunming's Yueguangcheng Night Club, where he violently assaulted one of them. The next day, Sun moved the girls to a beer house in Haosheng Entertainment City in Kunming and further assaulted them. In the end, one girl suffered severe injuries, multiple extensive soft tissue contusions throughout the body, right frontal lobe contusion and laceration, 2–8 rib fractures in the left thoracic rib, limited lower limb movement and peripheral nerve damage. She also suffered retrograde amnesia, and fell into a coma.

1998 trial and aftermath 
On 18 February 1998, the Kunming Intermediate People's Court tried and sentenced Sun to death, and deprivation of political rights for life for rape; 15 years in prison for assaulting women; 7 years imprisonment for intentional harm; 3 years imprisonment for provocation and nuisance; 2 years, 4 months and 12 days of imprisonment for other offences; the total punishment was execution and deprivation of political rights for life.

On 9 March 1999, the Higher People's Court of Yunnan province reprieved his death sentence for two years. On 27 September 2007, the Yunnan Higher People's Court retrialed Sun and sentenced him to 20 years in prison

In 2008, while Sun was detained in the First Prison in Yunnan Province, his mother, Sun Heyu, and stepfather, Li Qiaozhong, asked Yunnan justice system officials to change Sun's inmate assessment score to "active improver", and falsely credited several inventions to Sun. These falsifications counted towards the reduction of Sun's sentence.

In January 2009, Sun was transferred to the Second Prison in Yunnan province. Due to his supposed inventions and good behaviour, according to Article 78 of the criminal law, Sun was eligible for a commutation of two years and eight months.

2010 release 
On 11 April 2010, Sun was released after several commutations which resulted in an actual sentence of 12 years and 5 months. After being released from prison, he changed his name to Li Linchen, became a shareholder in several businesses and operated many bars in Kunming.

On the evening of 21 July 2018, Sun beat up a person known only as "Wang" in Guandu District, Kunming, causing them to be seriously injured and several other people to suffer various degrees of injury. After the incident, the Guandu Branch of the Kunming Public Security Bureau opened an investigation on 30 July 2018.

Intervention of Central Anti-crime Supervision Team and arrest 
On 3 January 2019, Sun's case was transferred to the Guandu District People's Court and it was discovered that Sun was a criminal who had been sentenced to death in 1998. This breach of justice was conveyed to the Yunnan Provincial Party Committee. At this point, the case began to attract significant media attention.

On 18 March 2019, the Guandu District People's Court arrested Sun; public security organisations investigated Sun's suspected crimes after his release from prison in April 2010, and found that Sun and his gang members had gathered to fight, opened a casino, tried to cause trouble, and falsely imprisoned others, as well as other suspected crimes.

In April 2019, after the 20th Central Anti-crime and Evil Supervision Team entered Yunnan, the case was designated as a key case for supervision. In May, the Office of the Leading Group of the National Anti-Crime Special Campaign also listed the case.

On 4 June 2019, a team consisting of the National Supervisory Commission of the Central Commission for Discipline Inspection, led by the Central Political and Legal Affairs Commission, the Office of the Leading Group of the National Anti-Crime Special Commission, the Supreme People's Court, the Supreme People's Procuratorate, the Ministry of Public Security and the Ministry of Justice urged relevant departments of Yunnan Province to handle Sun's case.

On 26 July 2019, the Yunnan Provincial Higher People's Court declared the original trial decision on 27 September 2007, to be the result of a mistrial and announced a retrial. Sun was detained while he was re-tried.

2019 re-trial and execution 
On 14 October 2019, the Yunnan Provincial Higher People's Court re-tried Sun's rape and assault offences. In addition, the Procuratorate of Yunnan Province filed a public prosecution for Sun's suspected participation in gang organisations after his 2010 release. Nineteen public officials and affiliates suspected of crimes relating to Sun's case were summoned to court for review and prosecution.

On 6 and 7 November 2019, the Intermediate People's Court of Yuxi City, Yunnan Province tried 13 people, including Sun, on suspicion of leadership and participation in gang organisations. The People's Court of Jiangchuan District of Yuxi City also accused Li Shuang and other 22 protectors involved in Sun's case of opening a casino, provoking trouble, assault, false imprisonment, fraud and intentional harm.

On 8 November 2019, the Intermediate People's Court of Yuxi City, Yunnan Province continued to hold court, and announced the trial of a criminal case involving 13 people including Sun, accusing them of the organisation, leadership, and participation in gang organisations. Sun was accused of organising and leading a gang, setting up casinos, causing trouble, false imprisonment, intentional harm, hindering testimony, and bribery. Combining the punishments, Sun was sentenced to 25 years' imprisonment, deprivation of political rights for 5 years, and confiscation of all personal property. Sun's rape trial was scheduled to occur later. On 17 December, the Yunnan Provincial Higher People's Court publicly re-trialed the previous case and dismissed the appeal of 4 people including Sun, and maintained the original sentence of 25 years in prison.

On 14 December 2019, the Yunnan Provincial Commission for Discipline Inspection investigated five officials involved in Sun's case. They were punished with warnings within the party.

On 15 December 2019, multiple courts (including the Yuxi Intermediate People's Court of Yunnan Province) issued public sentences on 19 criminal cases involving public officials and important related persons in Sun's case. Among them, Sun's stepfather Li Qiaozhong was sentenced to 19 years in prison, and Sun's mother Sun He was sentenced to 20 years in prison.

On 23 December 2019, the Yunnan Higher People's Court publicly sentenced Sun in the retrial of the crimes of rape, assault, intentional injury, and provocation from 1997, and decided to uphold the first ruling of the Kunming Intermediate People's Court in February 1998, in which Sun was sentenced to death. On 12 February 2020, the Supreme People's Court approved the death sentence issued by the Higher People's Court of Yunnan Province.

On 20 February 2020, according to the Supreme Court's death penalty execution order, the Kunming Intermediate People's Court executed Sun.

Rulings on Sun's associates 
On 15 December 2019, courts including the Yuxi Intermediate People's Court of Yunnan Province, the People's Court of Hongta district in Yuxi City, and the People's Court of Tonghai County in Yuxi City sentenced 19 criminal cases involving people protecting Sun, including officers protecting him and his accomplices.

Some defendants were also fined separately and the stolen money was confiscated.

References 

1977 births
2020 deaths
Gang members
People from Kunming
Chinese people convicted of rape
21st-century executions by China
People executed by China by lethal injection
People executed for murder